Prue Acton, OBE (born 26 April 1943) is an Australian fashion designer, often referred to as "Australia's golden girl of fashion" during the 1960s.

Early life
Prudence Leigh Acton was born in Benalla, Victoria and educated at Firbank Anglican Girls' Grammar School in Melbourne. Between 1958 and 1962 she completed a Diploma of Art majoring in Printed Textiles at Royal Melbourne Institute of Technology. She married Michael Charles Treloar in 1966. On 19 September 1966 they had their first child, Tiffany Leigh Treloar and, a few years later, they had their second child, Atlanta Priscilla Treloar.

Career
In 1963 Acton established her own fashion design business in Flinders Lane, Melbourne, and by age 21 she was turning over 350 designs a year and selling an average of 1,000 dresses a week through 80 outlets in Australia and New Zealand. As her fashion business took off, Acton also began to develop her own range of cosmetics to complement the range. In 1967, she became the first Australia female designer to mount a show of her own range of garments in New York. By 1982 the estimated world-wide sales of her designs were $11 million with garments sold in Australia, Japan, USA, Canada and New Zealand and her designs made under licence in America, Japan, and Germany.

Acton also designed the Australian Olympic uniforms for 1980, Lake Placid, USA); 1984, Los Angeles; and 1988, Seoul.

Prue Acton initially wanted to become a traditional artist – a painter – before focusing on fashion. "At 15 I went to RMIT; I was one of the youngest ever to go to RMIT" Acton says about her art studies that lead up to her fashion career "And during that time I was making my own clothes and making clothes for friend and that's how I was making pocket money". Right after graduating, Acton worked on clothing samples, and began her business. At the start of her career, she wrote a fashion column for the journal Go-Set. Acton was the first Australian female designer to show her own fashion range in New York.

Acton returned to painting in the 1980s. She shifted her focus from fashion to painting because "it's all about making money, and I’m becoming far more interested in painting". Acton found the art forms to be similar: "I don't think it makes any difference whether I'm painting or I'm a designer, it's about the art of what we do, of how the parts come together". She attended life drawing classes at Swinburne College, and studied painting with Clifton Pugh and Mervyn Moriarty. From 1989, Acton held exhibitions with Clifton Pugh and the Dunmoochin Artists.

Designers working with Prue Acton 

 Marcos Davidson
 Maree Menzel
 Myra Jane Sinn

Awards
Australian Wool Board Wool Fashion Awards, 1965, 1966, 1969, 1970, 1971
David Jones Awards for Fashion Excellence, 1971, 1972, 1978
FIA (Fashion Industry of Australia) Lyrebird Awards 1971, 1973 (Hall of Fame), 1978, 1980
Awarded OBE (Officer of the Most Excellent Order of the British Empire), 1982
Australian Fashion Awards, 1985, 1987

In 2005, Acton was honoured on a commemorative Australian postage stamp, along with other Australian fashion designers, Collette Dinnigan, Akira Isogawa, Joe Saba, Carla Zampatti and fellow RMIT alum Jenny Bannister.

References

External links 
DAAO Biographical Entry for Prue Acton
MilesAgo Profile for Prue Acton
Transcript of Prue Acton interview with George Negus – 29 April 2004
How Art Changed My Life
"Prue Acton's View of Light" article for ABC South East, by Bill Brown includes post-designer life as an exhibiting artist.

1943 births
Living people
Australian fashion designers
Australian women fashion designers
Australian women company founders
Australian company founders
Australian Officers of the Order of the British Empire
People from Benalla
RMIT University alumni